Harshwardhan Vasantrao Sapkal is a member of the 13th Maharashtra Legislative Assembly. He represents the Buldhana Assembly Constituency. He belongs to the Indian National Congress.

On 22 March 2017, Sapkal was suspended along with 18 other MLAs until 31 December for interrupting Maharashtra Finance Minister Sudhir Mungantiwar during a state budget session and burning copies of the budget outside the assembly four days earlier.

References

Maharashtra MLAs 2014–2019
People from Buldhana
Marathi politicians
Living people
Year of birth missing (living people)
Indian National Congress politicians from Maharashtra